Thomson's lamp is a philosophical puzzle based on infinites.  It was devised in 1954 by British philosopher James F. Thomson, who used it to analyze the possibility of a supertask, which is the completion of an infinite number of tasks.

Consider a lamp with a toggle switch.  Flicking the switch once turns the lamp on.  Another flick will turn the lamp off.  Now suppose that there is a being who is able to perform the following task:  starting a timer, he turns the lamp on.  At the end of one minute, he turns it off.  At the end of another half minute, he turns it on again.  At the end of another quarter of a minute, he turns it off.  At the next eighth of a minute, he turns it on again, and he continues thus, flicking the switch each time after waiting exactly one-half the time he waited before flicking it previously.  The sum of this infinite series of time intervals is exactly two minutes.

The following question is then considered: Is the lamp on or off at two minutes? Thomson reasoned that this supertask creates a contradiction:

Mathematical series analogy

The question is related to the behavior of Grandi's series, i.e. the divergent infinite series

 S = 1 − 1 + 1 − 1 + 1 − 1 + · · ·

For even values of n, the above finite series sums to 1; for odd values, it sums to 0. In other words, as n takes the values of each of the non-negative integers 0, 1, 2, 3, ... in turn, the series generates the sequence {1, 0, 1, 0, ...}, representing the changing state of the lamp. The sequence does not converge as n tends to infinity, so neither does the infinite series.

Another way of illustrating this problem is to rearrange the series:

 S = 1 − (1 − 1 + 1 − 1 + 1 − 1 + · · ·)

The unending series in the brackets is exactly the same as the original series S. This means S = 1 − S which implies S = 1⁄2. In fact, this manipulation can be rigorously justified: there are generalized definitions for the sums of series that do assign Grandi's series the value 1⁄2.

One of Thomson's objectives in his original 1954 paper is to differentiate supertasks from their series analogies. He writes of the lamp and Grandi's series,

Later, he claims that even the divergence of a series does not provide information about its supertask: "The impossibility of a super-task does not depend at all on whether some vaguely-felt-to-be-associated arithmetical sequence is convergent or divergent."

See also 
 List of paradoxes
 Ross–Littlewood paradox
 Zeno's paradoxes
 Zeno machine

Notes

References

Earman, John and Norton, John (1996) Infinite Pains: The Trouble with Supertasks. In Benacerraf and his Critics, Adam Morton and Stephen P. Stich (Eds.), p. 231-261.

Supertasks
Paradoxes of infinity
Grandi's series